Peter Stein (born 18 January 1968) is a German politician of the Christian Democratic Union (CDU) who served as a member of the Bundestag from the state of Mecklenburg-Vorpommern from 2013 to 2021.

Early career 
Born in Siegen, North Rhine-Westphalia, Stein studied urban planning at the Technical University of Dortmund before moving for the Rostock city administration.

Political career 
He unsuccessfully contested Rostock at the 2009 federal election.

Stein first became a member of the Bundestag in the 2013 German federal election. He was a member of the Committee on Economic Cooperation and Development and the Committee on Economic and Energy Affairs.

In addition to his committee assignments, Stein served as deputy chairman of the Parliamentary Friendship Group for Relations with the Maghreb States. 

He lost his seat in the 2021 federal election.

Political positions 
In June 2017, Stein voted against his parliamentary group’s majority and in favor of Germany’s introduction of same-sex marriage.

References

External links 

 Bundestag biography 

1968 births
Living people
Members of the Bundestag for Mecklenburg-Western Pomerania
Members of the Bundestag 2017–2021
Members of the Bundestag 2013–2017
People from Siegen
Members of the Bundestag for the Christian Democratic Union of Germany